Plant Biotechnology Journal, an Open Access journal, publishes high-impact original research and incisive reviews with an emphasis on molecular plant sciences and their applications through plant biotechnology. It was established in 2003 and is published by Wiley-Blackwell in association with the Society for Experimental Biology and the Association of Applied Biologists. The editor-in-chief is Henry Daniell (University of Pennsylvania). According to the Journal Citation Reports, the journal has a 2021 impact factor of 13.263, ranking it 5th out of 238 journals in the category "Plant Sciences" and 8th out of 158 journals in the category "Biotechnology & Applied Microbiology". As an Open Access journal, articles are accessible globally without restriction.  To cover the cost of publishing, Plant Biotechnology Journal charges a publication fee.

References

External links

Botany journals
Biotechnology journals
English-language journals
Wiley-Blackwell academic journals
Publications established in 2003
Academic journals associated with international learned and professional societies of Europe